(Evening magic), WAB 57, is a song composed by Anton Bruckner in 1878.

History 
Bruckner composed the song on a text of Heinrich von der Mattig on 13 January 1878. He dedicated it to Carl Almeroth. The piece was not performed during the composer's life, because of its performance difficulties (humming voices). It was first performed in 1911 by Viktor Keldorfer with the Wiener Männergesang-Verein (Vienna men's choral association), and was thereafter published by the Universal Edition. It was very popular with Austrian choirs during the interbellum.

Text 

Abendzauber uses a text by Heinrich von der Mattig.

Music 
The 82-bar long work in G-flat major is scored for  choir, tenor or baritone soloist. Similarly to Das hohe Lied, the first part (58 bars) is sung by the soloist with an accompaniment of humming voices. From "Wer könnte je vergessen", the melody is taken over by the choir. In addition, four horns are figuring Alphorns, and a Ferngesang (chant from a distance) of female voices is figuring yodelers.

The song, which is in the line of Mitternacht, WAB 80, and the two settings of Um Mitternacht (WAB 89 and 90), is a remarkable example of nature imagery. Bruckner's specialist Ernst Kurth considers this original, somewhat odd piece as one Bruckner's most romantic works.

Selected discography 

The first recording of Abendzauber was by Bryan Fairfax, with Alfred Orda (tenor), the BBC Chorus and the horns of the London Symphony Orchestra, Szymanowski - Bruckner - Schumann. A Choral Anthology – CD: Symposium Records 1423 (4 September 1960)

A selection of the few other recordings:
 Rolf Beck, Markus Krause (baritone), Süddeutsches Vokalensemble and horn ensemble Marie Luise Neunecker, Romantische Chormusik – CD:Koch Schwann 3 1398-2 H1, 1994
 Timothy Seelig, Timothy Jenkins (tenor), Turtle Creek Chorale and Fort Worth Symphony Brass, Times of the Day – CD: Reference Recordings RR-67, 1995
 Jan Schumacher, Christoph Prégardien (Tenor), Camerata Musica Limburg, Serenade. Songs of night and love – CD: Genuin GEN 12224, 2011 - with male "yodelers"

References

Sources 
 Anton Bruckner – Sämtliche Werke, Band XXIII/2:  Weltliche Chorwerke (1843–1893), Musikwissenschaftlicher Verlag der Internationalen Bruckner-Gesellschaft, Angela Pachovsky and Anton Reinthaler (Editor), Vienna, 1989
 Cornelis van Zwol, Anton Bruckner 1824–1896 – Leven en werken, uitg. Thoth, Bussum, Netherlands, 2012. 
 Uwe Harten, Anton Bruckner. Ein Handbuch. , Salzburg, 1996. .

External links 
 
  
 Abendzauber Ges-Dur, WAB 57  – Critical discography by Hans Roelofs 
 The following performances of Abendzauber can be heard on YouTube:
Byung-Moo Yoo with the Korea Male Choir and the Ebangel Female Choir (2001): Anton Bruckner - Abendzauber
Josef Böck with Johannes Gissen (baritone), the Wiener Staatsopernchor, the Wiener Vokalisten and the Hornensemble der Wiener Symphoniker: Bruckner Abenzauner  
Josef Böck with Dritan Luca (tenor) and the same other performers (2007): Abendzauber

Weltliche Chorwerke by Anton Bruckner
1878 compositions
Compositions in G-flat major